Bill Carter is an American singer, songwriter, musician, and member of the Austin Music Hall of Fame. He is best known for co-writing "Crossfire" and "Willie The Wimp", recorded by Stevie Ray Vaughan; "Why Get Up?", recorded by The Fabulous Thunderbirds; and "Jacksboro Highway", recorded by John Mayall. Carter's songs have been covered by other blues, country, and rock artists including Waylon Jennings, Robert Palmer, Ruth Brown, Stray Cats, and Counting Crows.

Family 
Bill Carter was born to Cash Carter, a US Navy Boatswains Mate and Francis Infantino, an Italian-American from Brooklyn. Though Carter was raised in Washington State where his father was stationed, his family roots trace back to Kentucky. Carter's paternal grandfather William Henry Carter is the first cousin of A.P. Carter, musician and founding member of The Carter Family.

Career

Early career 
In 1976, Carter moved to Austin, Texas to pursue his music career. He soon met a University of Texas student from Oklahoma named Ruth Ellsworth while performing at the Inner Sanctum record store. Ellsworth would become his wife and writing partner.

After hearing the Texas blues band The Fabulous Thunderbirds were heading into the studio, Carter and Ellsworth deliberately wrote songs to present to the band. One of these songs, "Why Get Up?" made it onto the album that would become Tuff Enuff. The couple was struggling financially to the point they were nearly evicted from their house just before General Mill's purchased the rights to use the song in a breakfast cereal commercial.

Carter's solo record Stompin' Grounds was released in 1985 and featured Jimmie Vaughan on lead guitar. The song "Willie the Wimp" was inspired by an article Carter read in the Austin American-Statesman about the decadent funeral of Chicago pimp and drug dealer William "Wimp" Stokes Jr., complete with Stokes propped upright in a Cadillac shaped coffin with diamond rings on his fingers and $100 bills in his hands. "'We were reading the Austin American-Statesman over breakfast one morning, and your column about Willie the Wimp was in it,'" Carter recalled to journalist Bob Greene. "'I said to Ruth, 'This isn`t a column-it's a song. We drove to the studio, and in the two miles it took us to get there we put the column to music. Stevie's brother Jimmie was at the studio, and he called Stevie and told him about it. Stevie just loved that song. He performed it on stages all over the world. The audiences knew every word-and they would sing along with Stevie. Stevie would have this evil grin on his face as he sang it.'" A live recording of the song appeared the following year on the album Live Alive by Stevie Ray Vaughan and Double Trouble.

Carter, Ellsworth, and Stevie Ray Vaughan's bandmates Chris Layton, Tommy Shannon, and Reese Wynans came up with "Crossfire" while jamming together at Double Trouble's rehearsal space. The song was recorded for In Step, the fourth studio album by Stevie Ray Vaughan and Double Trouble. The album went on to win a Grammy for Best Contemporary Blues Album in 1989, and "Crossfire" won Song of the Year at the Austin Music Awards. In 2007, the writers of "Crossfire" were honored by BMI for more than one million aired performances of the song.

Sony Music released and later shelved Carter's 1988 solo album Loaded Dice. The album was produced by Chuck Leavell and featured Stevie and Jimmie Vaughan on guitars. The song, "Na Na Ne Na Nay" was re-released on Stevie Ray Vaughan's posthumous Solos, Sessions & Encores album, a compilation of recordings where Vaughan was either a guest or a sideman.

P 
Between 1993 and 1995, Carter was a member of the alternative rock band P, born out of a friendship between Carter, actor Johnny Depp, and Butthole Surfers frontman Gibby Haynes. The band performed at the Austin Music Awards and released a record on Capitol Records that featured contributions from Red Hot Chili Peppers bassist Flea and Sex Pistols guitarist Steve Jones. The song "Michael Stipe" received airplay on alternative rock radio.

West of Memphis: Voices For Justice 
Bill and Ruth E. Carter began corresponding with the West Memphis Three's Damien Echols after seeing the Paradise Lost documentary film. Echols' wife Lorri Davis brought the Carters a gift of three paper roses made by Damien in prison and representing each of the West Memphis Three. In return, they wrote "Anything Made of Paper" for Echols, its title alluding to the fact, as a death row inmate, Echols could only send and receive gifts made of paper. The song was recorded with Johnny Depp on guitar for the soundtrack to West of Memphis, the documentary film written and directed by Amy Berg and produced by Peter Jackson and Fran Walsh. Carter performed the song, backed by a band that included Depp, on the Late Show with David Letterman in early 2013.

Present 
Carter performs off-and-on with a group of veteran Austin musicians that became known as The Blame. The group has at different times featured guitarists Charlie Sexton, Will Sexton, Denny Freeman, and David Lee Holt; drummers Chris Layton and Dony Wynn; keyboardist Mike Thompson; and bassist Andy Salmon.

In 2016, Carter released his ninth solo album, Innocent Victims & Evil Companions through Forty Below Records. Writing for AllMusic, Stephen Thomas Erlewine characterized the album as a combination of two aesthetics, muscular roots-rock and dusty Americana poetry. "...the most impressive thing about Innocent Victims & Evil Companions is how Carter threads all these sounds and sensibilities to create something that's distinctively Texan and humanly idiosyncratic."

Carter toured the following two years in support of Innocent Victims & Evil Companions and opened shows around the US and Canada for English blues musician and label mate John Mayall.

On his 2017 full-length album, Bill Carter, Carter recorded solo acoustic versions of his best known songs that were covered by other artists. Peter Blackstock wrote in the Austin American-Statesman, "The arrangements mostly are stripped down to basics of acoustic guitar and vocals, with occasional accents of rhythm and harmonica. That puts the spotlight squarely on the songwriting, and the results are a compelling reminder that Carter is one of the best American-roots tunesmiths Austin has ever produced."

Artistry 
Carter cites Bob Dylan, The Beatles, and songwriter Ron Davies as early influences.

Discography

As a Solo Artist 
 (1985) Stompin' Grounds (Crosscut Records)
 (1988) Loaded Dice (Sony)
 (1994) City of the Violet Crown
 (2011) Behind the Barn
 (2013) Unknown
 (2013) "Anything Made of Paper" West of Memphis Motion Picture Soundtrack
 (2016) Innocent Victims & Evil Companions (Forty Below Records)
 (2017) Bill Carter (Forty Below Records)

As a Band Member 
 (1995) P by P (Captol Records)
 (2010) Carter Doster Sexton by Carter Doster Sexton

As a Songwriter

References 

Year of birth missing (living people)
Living people
American alternative country singers
American country singer-songwriters
American male singer-songwriters